Czarny Las may refer to the following places:
Czarny Las, Kuyavian-Pomeranian Voivodeship (north-central Poland)
Czarny Las, Łask County in Łódź Voivodeship (central Poland)
Czarny Las, Podlaskie Voivodeship (north-east Poland)
Czarny Las, Radomsko County in Łódź Voivodeship (central Poland)
Czarny Las, Zduńska Wola County in Łódź Voivodeship (central Poland)
Czarny Las, Lublin Voivodeship (east Poland)
Czarny Las, Grodzisk Mazowiecki County in Masovian Voivodeship (east-central Poland)
Czarny Las, Piaseczno County in Masovian Voivodeship (east-central Poland)
Czarny Las, Greater Poland Voivodeship (west-central Poland)
Czarny Las, Częstochowa County in Silesian Voivodeship (south Poland)
Czarny Las, Lubliniec County in Silesian Voivodeship (south Poland)